Paolo Dossena (born 29 January 1942) is an Italian record producer, lyricist, arranger and composer.

Life and career 
Born in Parma, Dossena moved to Rome in the early 1960s and started collaborating with RCA Records, soon specializing in producing  French artists such as Charles Aznavour, Dalida, Sylvie Vartan and Alain Barrière, often also translating the original lyrics of their songs for their Italian cover versions.

In the early 1970s Dossena founded the label Delta, and produced artists such as Riccardo Cocciante, Antonello Venditti, Francesco De Gregori and Patty Pravo, occasionally also serving as arranger and songwriter. After collaborating with the record company CAM, in 1990 he founded a new label, Compagnia Nuove Indye, also known as CNI Music, which launched groups such as  Almamegretta and Agricantus.

Dossena is also active as a film score composer, and his credits include films by Mario Monicelli and Ferzan Özpetek.

References

External links

1942 births
Living people
Musicians from Parma
Italian songwriters
Male songwriters
Italian lyricists
Italian male composers
Italian music arrangers
Italian record producers
Italian film score composers
Italian male film score composers